You're Everything is a jazz album produced by Schoener Hören Records and Kulturradio, it was officially released in March 2008.   The album was critically acclaimed by Jazz Podium magazine as the second recording for the Berlin Jazz Orchestra with vocal artist Marc Secara.  Jazz artist Jiggs Whigham is featured on this release as both instrumentalist (trombone) and musical director.

Background 
After being founded in 2000, the Berlin Jazz Orchestra had their first demo release with the label 44 Records in 2004 (Update), produced by Jacky Wagner.  Roughly the same program was to be released later in 2007 for You're Everything. The Update CD release paved the way for this in creating fine demo and test CD where many details of Steve Gray's arrangements were worked out in the studio.

Track listing

Recording sessions 
 March 12–15, 2007 (17 piece ensemble)
 May 21, 2014 (strings only)
all instrumental tracks recorded at RBB Studios in Berlin, Germany.
vocal tracks recorded at Bob Music Studio, Berlin

Personnel

Musicians 
Conductor and solo trombone: Jiggs Whigham 
Arranger: Steve Gray 
Vocals: Marc Secara
Alto Saxophone: Jonas Schoen, Nico Lohmann
Tenor Saxophone: Patrick Braun, Thomas Walter
Baritone Saxophone: Nik Leistle
Trumpet: Daniel Collette, Jürgen Hahn, Martin Gerwig, Nikolaus Neuser
Trombone: Arne Fischer, Christoph Hermann, Ralf Zickerick, Simon Harrer
Piano: Claus-Dieter Bandorf
Guitar: Jeanfrançois Prins
Bass: Ralph Graessler
Drums: Tobias Backhaus
Percussion: Uli Moritz

Production 
Contractor (strings): Clemens Lindner
Executive producer: Marc Secara
Producer: Jiggs Whigham
Associate producer: Ulf Dreschselfor RBB Kulturradio 
Recording engineers: Wolfgang Hoff, Willi Leopold, and Bobert Mattfor RBB Kulturradio 
Mixing engineer and mastering: Volker Greve at Studio Greve
Liner notes: Jiggs Whigham
Photography: Christoph Musiol 
Art/Design: Dominik Schech

Critical reception

"Marc Secara and his Berlin Jazz Orchestra present with You're Everything a lavishly produced CD.  Contributing flattering, powerful, and despite his youth, a secure voice and soulful interpretations that are not too corny, just as did the rousing original arrangements by Steve Gray, the funky brass riffs and jazzy solos of a big band under the direction of trombone soloist Jiggs Whigham.   The strings remain subtly in the background.

... an unconditional recommendation for all friends of an 'old crooner.'  Tasty and sure past footsteps, Secara makes big steps of his own."

Jazzpodium

Release history

See also 
Berlin Jazz Orchestra
Marc Secara
Jiggs Whigham

References

External links 
 

 

2008 albums
Jazz albums by German artists
Big band albums
Vocal jazz albums